Karla Schmidt is a German writer and editor. In 2009 she received the Deutscher Science Fiction Preis for short fiction for the story Weg mit Stella Maris. She also edited the anthology Hinterland and contributed the story Erlösungsdeadline to it. It was a science fiction and slipstream anthology with stories inspired by David Bowie songs. Besides Schmidt Dietmar Dath and others were in it.

References

External links 
Karla Schmidt home page (German-language) 
 

German science fiction writers
Science fiction editors
Living people
Year of birth missing (living people)